Nelle Elizabeth Nichols Peters, usually known as Nelle Peters, (1884–1974) was one of Kansas City's most prolific architects, designing a wide range of buildings there.

Biography
Born  Elizabeth Nichols in a sod house in Niagara, North Dakota, she attended Buena Vista College at Storm Lake, Iowa, where she did well in drawing and mathematics. As a result, she decided to become an architect, initially finding work as a drafter with Eisentrout, Colby and Pottenger in Sioux City where she stayed for four years while taking correspondence courses in architecture. In 1907, she was sent to work in the firm's Kansas City office but in 1909 she left to establish her own business.
 
In 1911, she married William H. Peters, a designer with the Kansas City Terminal Railway, and continued to work.  Following her 1923 divorce, she entered a particularly productive phase, designing a multitude of buildings over the next five years. Among her most outstanding works in Kansas City are the Ambassador Hotel, the Luzier Cosmetic Company building, and a number of apartment buildings, including the "literary group" named after famous authors on the west side of Country Club Plaza.

Nelle Peters' work also included buildings in Tulsa and Oklahoma City, Oklahoma; Columbia, Clinton, Boonville, and Jefferson City, Missouri; Nashville, North Carolina; Newark, New Jersey; and Columbus, Ohio.

Except for two periods of illness, Peters remained an active architect until retirement in 1965. She specialized in the design of apartment buildings and hotels, though she also designed churches, residences, and commercial buildings. Frequent use of terra cotta ornamentation is a characteristic of her style.

Peters spent her last years in a nursing home in Sedalia, Missouri where she died in 1974. She is buried in Memorial Park Cemetery in Kansas City.

Legacy
Peters was considered one of Kansas City's most prolific architects, and she designed nearly 1,000 buildings.

There are two districts in Kansas City that have been named in her honor on the Kansas City Register of Historic Places. In 1982, the Nelle E. Peters Historic District was dedicated in a section of buildings at the corner of Summit Avenue and 37th Street. In 1989, the  Nelle E. Peters Thematic Historic District was established within part of the Country Club Plaza.

She also has a district named after her in Kansas City that is on the National Register of Historic Places as of July 23, 2009. The Nelle E. Peters Troost Avenue Historic District includes six apartment buildings in the block of 2700 Troost Avenue.

Peters is one of 13 women honored for their notable contributions to Kansas City, Missouri, on the Women's Leadership Fountain at the Paseo and E 9th St. In 2021, she was posthumously inducted into the Starr Women's Hall of Fame, which honors women who have made Kansas City a better place to live.

External links 
Pioneering Women of American Architecture, Nelle Elizabeth Peters
 https://www.kcur.org/community/2016-01-14/who-was-nelle-peters-why-people-want-to-save-work-of-female-kansas-city-architect. \
 Nelle E. Peters Induction Video for the Starr Women's Hall of Fame

References

1884 births
1974 deaths
20th-century American architects
American women architects
People from Kansas City, Missouri
Architects from Missouri
Architects from North Dakota
Buena Vista University alumni
20th-century American women